Spring Garden may refer to:

Places

Canada
 Spring Garden, Halifax, in Nova Scotia

Hong Kong
 Spring Garden Lane

United Kingdom
 Spring Gardens, a small street in London containing government buildings, near Whitehall

United States
Spring Garden, Alabama, an unincorporated community
Spring Garden, California, an unincorporated community
Spring Garden (Laurel, Delaware), historic site in Laurel, Delaware
Spring Garden, Florida, the former name of DeLeon Springs, Florida
Spring Garden (Miami), a neighborhood in Miami, Florida
Spring Garden-John Leavell, Bryantsville, KY, listed on the NRHP in Kentucky
Discovery-Spring Garden, Maryland, two communities combined in a Census-designated place
Spring Garden, Missouri, an unincorporated community
Spring Garden, Philadelphia, Pennsylvania, a neighborhood in Philadelphia
Spring Garden District, Pennsylvania, a defunct district of Philadelphia County before consolidation of the city
Spring Garden College, a defunct private technical college in Spring Garden, Philadelphia
Spring Garden School No. 1, Philadelphia, PA, listed on the NRHP in Philadelphia, Pennsylvania
Spring Garden School No. 2, Philadelphia, PA, listed on the NRHP in Philadelphia, Pennsylvania
Spring Garden (Pittsburgh), Pennsylvania
Spring Garden Township, York County, Pennsylvania
Spring Garden-Terra Verde, Texas, a census-designated place

Others
The Parsonage Garden at Nuenen, or Spring Garden, oil painting by Vincent van Gogh

See also
Spring Garden station (disambiguation)
Spring Gardens